Microbacterium pygmaeum is a Gram-positive, aerobic and non-motile bacterium from the genus Microbacterium which has been isolated from soil from the Aoyama Cemetery in Tokyo, Japan.

References

Further reading

External links
Type strain of Microbacterium pygmaeum at BacDive -  the Bacterial Diversity Metadatabase	

Bacteria described in 2008
pygmaeum